Mohsen Saleh (born 22 June 1949) is an Egyptian Football Analyst and a former football player and manager. He was recently appointed as Head of Football Planning Committee at Al Ahly club. [1]

Football career
As a midfielder, Saleh had a very successful run with the Egyptian club Al Ahly. He was also an international midfielder for the Egyptian national team. With his club, Al Ahly, he won three Egyptian league titles. He also had spells with Egypt's Al Masry, Kuwaiti club Tadamon, and the Lebanese Nejmeh Sporting Club.

Managing career
As a manager, Saleh's greatest successes came while managing the Egyptian football club, Ismaily. He led them to an Egyptian Cup title in 2000 as well as an Egyptian League title in 2002. He also has a 2nd division League title for Saudi Arabian club El-Watany to his name. In addition to winning Kuwait Crown Prince Cup with Al Araby club in 2006. As an assistant coach, Saleh helped his former club Al Ahly to two Egyptian league titles. In 2002 the Egyptian Football Association awarded Saleh with the 'Best Coach of the Year' title for the year 2002.

Managerial history
 1979: Ahly Junior Team and assistant coach for the first team (Egypt)
 1980: El-Khaleeg (Saudi Arabia)
 1981-1984: El-Ain Junior Team (United Arab Emirates)
 1984-1985: El-Ahly Dubai (United Arab Emirates) (Assistant)
 1985-1988: El-Watany (Saudi Arabia) (Saudi 2nd division League Champion 1987)
 1988-1989: Port Foad (Egypt) (Qualified to the Egyptian Premier League after long absence)
 1990-1991: Al Masry (Egypt)
 1991-1992: Mirbat (Oman)
 1994: Egyptian National Team (Assistant)
 1994: Egyptian Youth Team U19
 1995: Egyptian National Team
 1996-1997: Negma (Saudi Arabia)
 1997-1999: Al Masry (Egypt) (African Cup semifinal 1999)
 1999-2002: Al Ismaily (Egypt) (Egyptian Cup Champion 2000 / CAF winners' Cup runner-Up 2000 / Egyptian League runner-up 2000 / Egyptian League Champion 2002)
 2002-2004: Egyptian National Team
 2004: Al Nasr (Saudi Arabia)
 2005: Al Araby (Kuwait)
 2006: Libyan National Football Team
 2007: Yemeni National Football Team
 2008-2009: Yemeni National Football Team
 2009: Hazem (Saudi Arabia)
 2010: Semoha (Egypt)
 August-2010: Saleh retired from coaching

Media career 
Saleh worked as a Football Analyst for multiple tv channels, including Nile Sports, Melody Sports, Orbit, Al Jazeera Sports, Abu Dhabi Sports channels.https://twitter.com/MohsenSaleh

Managerial statistics

References

External links
Egyptian Football Net bio

1949 births
Living people
Egyptian football managers
Egyptian footballers
Egypt national football team managers
Al Masry SC players
Al Ahly SC players
Nejmeh SC players
Al Nassr FC managers
Ismaily SC managers
Smouha SC managers
Al-Hazm FC managers
Libya national football team managers
Yemen national football team managers
2004 African Cup of Nations managers
Sportspeople from Port Said
Egyptian Premier League players
Association football midfielders
Egyptian expatriate footballers
Lebanese Premier League players
Saudi Professional League managers
Expatriate footballers in Lebanon
Egyptian expatriate sportspeople in Lebanon
Expatriate football managers in Saudi Arabia
Egyptian expatriate sportspeople in Saudi Arabia
Expatriate football managers in Kuwait
Expatriate football managers in Yemen
Al Tadhamon SC players
Kuwait Premier League managers
Kuwait Premier League players
Expatriate footballers in Kuwait
Egyptian expatriate sportspeople in Yemen
Egyptian expatriate sportspeople in Kuwait
Egyptian expatriate sportspeople in Libya
Expatriate football managers in Libya
Al-Arabi SC (Kuwait) managers
Expatriate football managers in Oman
Egyptian expatriate sportspeople in Oman
Oman Professional League managers
Al Masry SC managers
Egyptian expatriate sportspeople in the United Arab Emirates
Expatriate football managers in the United Arab Emirates
Egyptian expatriate football managers